Supernova Era is a science fiction novel written by the Chinese writer Liu Cixin.

This novel portrays a luminous stellar explosion releasing powerful electromagnetic radiation and high-energy particles into the universe as far as the solar system, eight light-years away. Around the world, the chromosomes in human cells are damaged by high-energy rays. Only children under thirteen can repair the damage, while other age groups have only about a year left to survive. The world becomes strange at this moment.

Background 
Supernova Era first version was created in 1991, but the first official release was in 2003. Liu Cixin has repeatedly revised the book and published three different editions, not including unreleased versions. Of all, the 2009 edition is the longest and most complete. Tor Books published the English translation by Joel Martinsen in 2019.

Plot 
On a seemingly ordinary summer night, a catastrophe brewing for hundreds of millions of years reaches the Earth from deep space. The radiation from the supernova explosion irreversibly irradiates everyone over the age of 13, leaving them with only a few months to live. Children under 13 years old can recover. That means that all humans over thirteen in the world will die, and the Earth will become a world with only children.

It is a society the world has never seen before; adults are supposed to teach their children life skills in the shortest possible time, such as running a country, commanding an army, etc. The adults also leave their children the best gift, the Chinese Quantum, a super quantum computer, which will help the children go through a dark age that follows. In the early days of the supernova era, the world of children becomes the last continuation of the world of adults. After several months of seemingly smooth operation, it finally gets out of control.

When children are tired of the rules and regulations of the adult world, playing seems to be the only theme of the child world. First, they want to build a candy world, where the building shell is edible chocolate; They have created the maximal online games. Because all children are participants, online community organizations are even equipped to compete with the state power; In the end, they found that the most exciting game is war. Out-of-control children in the Antarctic continent started a world war; After that, China and the United States even exchanged their territory.

Characters 
In the following, Chinese names are written with the family name first and given name second

Adults

 Zheng Chen: homeroom teacher for a graduating primary school class-star class
 Zhang Lin: agent with the Central Extraordinary Commission
 The president of China 
 The premier of China

Chinese Children

 Yan Jing (Nickname: Glasses): one of the top Chinese leaders in the age of supernovas 
 Huahua: one of the top Chinese leaders in the age of supernovas 
 Xiaomeng: one of the top Chinese leaders in the age of supernovas 
 Lu Gang: chief of general staff of the People's Liberation Army

Other Children

 Herman Davey: president of the United States 
 Chester Vaughn: secretary of state of the United States
 Nelson Green: prime minister of the United Kingdom 
 Jean Pierre: president of the France

Reception 
The book was reviewed by several sources.

A Hugo Award-winning editor, Jason Heller], said, "Liu began writing 'Supernova Era' soon after the political uprising in Beijing's Tiananmen Square in 1989. The book is suffused with a sense of calamity, tragedy, and swift social change."

References 

Novels by Liu Cixin
20th-century Chinese novels
Post-apocalyptic novels